Conasprella gordyi is a species of sea snail, a marine gastropod mollusk in the family Conidae, the cone snails and their allies.

Like all species within the genus Conasprella, these snails are predatory and venomous. They are capable of "stinging" humans, therefore live ones should be handled carefully or not at all.

Description
The size of the shell varies between 16 mm and 20 mm.

Distribution
This species occurs in the Indian Ocean off the Mascarenes.

References

 Röckel, D. and Bondarev, I. 2000. Conus gordyi, a new species form Saya de Malha Bank, western Indian Ocean. La Conchiglia 31(293):41–43, 10 figs.
 Tucker J.K. & Tenorio M.J. (2009) Systematic classification of Recent and fossil conoidean gastropods. Hackenheim: Conchbooks. 296 pp.
  Puillandre N., Duda T.F., Meyer C., Olivera B.M. & Bouchet P. (2015). One, four or 100 genera? A new classification of the cone snails. Journal of Molluscan Studies. 81: 1–23

External links
 The Conus Biodiversity website
 

gordyi
Gastropods described in 2000